Hassan Sami Kocamemi (Kadıköy, Istanbul – Istanbul) was a Turkish footballer, who played as a defender. He was among the founding line-up of the Turkish football club Fenerbahçe.

References

Turkish footballers
Fenerbahçe S.K. footballers
Association football defenders
Year of birth missing
People from Kadıköy
Footballers from Istanbul